Burning Cats and Amputees is the first greatest hits album by heavy metal band BulletBoys.

Track listing

Personnel
 Marq Torien - lead vocals
 Mick Sweda - guitar, backing vocals
 Lonnie Vencent - bass, backing vocals
 Jimmy D'Anda - drums
BulletBoys - producer
Barry Conley - engineering, mixing
Mick Sweda - CD Layout

2000 greatest hits albums
BulletBoys albums
Cleopatra Records compilation albums